Diactenis youngi is a moth of the family Tortricidae. It is found in Taiwan.

The wingspan is 7.5 mm. The ground colour of the forewings is cream suffused with ochreous and dotted with brown between the median veins. The hindwings are white cream. Adults are on wing in mid-May.

References

Moths described in 2000
Schoenotenini
Moths of Taiwan
Taxa named by Józef Razowski